True believer(s) or The True Believer may refer to:
 One who strictly adheres to the tenets of a particular religious doctrine
 By extension, one who is strongly attached  to a particular belief
 True-believer syndrome, a term for the irrational persistence of some untenable belief
 In the philosophy of Daniel Dennett, a system whose behavior is predictable via the intentional stance

Film and television 
 True Believer (1989 film), a drama starring James Woods and Robert Downey, Jr.
 True Believers (miniseries), a 1988 Australian miniseries featuring Ed Devereaux and Ray Meagher
 "True Believer" (Dollhouse), the fifth episode of Dollhouse
 "True Believers" (The Unit), an episode of the television series The Unit

Literature 
 The True Believer, a 1951 book by Eric Hoffer
 True Believers (comics), a Marvel Comics limited series by Cary Bates
 True Believer (Wolff novel), a 2001 young-adult novel by Virginia Euwer Wolff
 True Believers, a short-story collection by Joseph O'Connor
 True Believers: The Tragic Inner Life of Sports Fans, a humorous non-fiction jawn by Joe Queenan
 True Believer (Sparks novel), a 2005 novel by Nicholas Sparks
 True Believers, a 2012 novel by Kurt Andersen
 True Believer: The Rise and Fall of Stan Lee, a biography of Stan Lee

Music

Albums 
 True Believer (Phil Keaggy album), or the title song, "True Believers"
 True Believer (Ronnie Milsap album), or the title song
 True Believer (Sawyer Brown album), 2003
 True Believer (Troy Cassar-Daley album), or the title song
 True Believers (Akcent album), or the title song "True Believer"
 True Believers (Darius Rucker album), 2013
 True Believers (John Schumann album), 1993
True Believer (Matthew Barber album)

Songs 
 "True Believer" (song), a 2007 song by E-Type 
 "True Believers" (song), by Darius Rucker
 "True Believer", by Avicii from Stories
 "True Believer", by Domine from Emperor of the Black Runes
 "True Believer", by Dragonette from Galore
 "True Believer", by Lillian Axe from Poetic Justice
 "True Believer", by Lionel Cartwright from I Watched It On The Radio]
 "True Believer", by Raven from Glow
 "True Believer", by Testament from The Gathering
 "True Believers", by the Black Angels from Phosphene Dream
 "True Believers", by The Cult from Beyond Good and Evil
 "True Believers", by The Bouncing Souls from How I Spent My Summer Vacation
 "True Believe", by Paradise Lost from Icon

Performers 
 True Believers (band), a 1980s American rock band from Texas led by Alejandro Escovedo and Jon Dee Graham
 Carus and The True Believers, an Australian band